Sagas is Equilibrium's second full-length album, released on 27 June 2008.

Track listing

Personnel
 Helge Stang − vocals
 René Berthiaume − guitar
 Andreas Völkl − guitar
 Sandra Völkl − bass guitar
 Manuel DiCamillo − drums

Special guest musicians
 Kurt Angerpower – guitar
 Ulrich Herkenhoff – pan flute
 Muki Seiler – accordion
 Agnes Malich – violin
 Gaby Koss – vocals
 Jörg Sieber
 Toni González (Karlahan vocalist)
 Karlahan crew

Notes

References

2008 albums
Equilibrium (band) albums
Nuclear Blast albums